is a Japanese alpine skier. She competed in the women's slalom at the 2006 Winter Olympics.

References

1985 births
Living people
Japanese female alpine skiers
Olympic alpine skiers of Japan
Alpine skiers at the 2006 Winter Olympics
Sportspeople from Nagano Prefecture
21st-century Japanese women